The Campaign for North Africa, subtitled "The Desert War, 1940–43", and generally referred to as CNA by wargamers, is an exceptionally detailed strategic "monster" board wargame published by Simulations Publications, Inc. (SPI) in 1978 that simulates the entire North African Campaign of World War II.

Description
The Campaign for North Africa has been called the longest board game ever produced, with estimates that a full game would take 1,500 hours to complete. Reviewer Luke Winkie pointed out that "If you and your group meets for three hours at a time, twice a month, you’d wrap up the campaign in about 20 years." It has also been called the most complex wargame ever designed, with the commonly cited example (noted in SPI's advertising) that Italian troops require additional water supplies to prepare pasta. The map board alone is 9.5 ft (3 m) long.

Although nominally a two-player game, the rules recommend ten players divided into two teams of five people, each team composed of a Commander-In-Chief, Logistics Commander, Rear Area Commander, Air Commander, and Front-line Commander.

Components
The boxed set contained in a large 4 inch deep box includes:

 5 34 in × 23 in paper hex grid maps scaled at 8 km (5 mi) per hex with thirty-one types of terrain; the maps when placed together form a single 34 in × 115 in board.  
 1,600 counters
 6 booklets:
"Historical Background": 16 page analysis of the North African campaign written by Al Nofi, Richard Berg, and Jim Dunnigan
"Land Game Rules of Play": 45 pages, plus 2 pages of addenda
"Air and Logistics Game Rules of Play and Scenarios": 23 pages of rules, 14 pages of scenarios, 7 pages of designer's notes
"Charts and Tables Common to Both Players": 16 pages
"Axis Exclusive Charts and Tables": 36 pages, including 73 charts and tables
"Commonwealth Exclusive Charts and Tables" 32 pages including 58 charts and tables
 12 logistical sheets 
 3 plastic counter storage trays
 1 six-sided die

Gameplay
The Wargamer Academy rates the complexity of CNA, on a scale of 1–10, as 10+. The complete campaign game takes 100 turns, each turn representing one week of game time. A number of shorter scenarios are included that are still long in comparison to other wargames. As reviewers noted, the game is less about combat, and more about managing logistics and supply lines.

To give an idea of the game's complexity, reviewer Nicholas Palmer outlined the actions for one side's single turn. As a first step, before playing, the player or team must make unit organization charts for every one of the hundreds of counters on their side. Then each turn:
Plan strategic air missions
Raid Malta
Plan Axis convoys 
Raid convoys
Distribute stores and consume stores
Calculate spillage/evaporation of water and adjust all supply dumps
Determine initiative
Determine weather (Hot weather = more evaporation of water)
Distribute water
Reorganize units
Calculate attrition of units short of water and stores
Begin building construction
Begin training
Rearrange supplies
Transport cargo between African ports
Bring convoys ashore
Deploy Commonwealth fleet
Ship repair
Plan tactical air mission if airplanes are fuelled
Begin air mission
Fight air-to-air combat
Fire flak
Carry out mission, return to base, airplane maintenance.
Place land units on reserve
Movement:
Move units, tracking fuel expenditure and breakdown points vis a vis weather
Enemy reaction
Move more units
Combat: 
Designate each tank and gun as deployed forward or back
Plot and fire barrages
Retreat before assault
Secretly assign all units to anti-armor or close-assault roles
Anti-armor fire
Adjust ammunition
Deploy destroyed tank markers and update unit records to reflect losses.
Carry out probes and close assaults
Release reserves
Move rear trucks
Begin repair of breakdowns
Make patrols
Repeat all movement and combat steps a second time
Repeat all movement and combat steps a third time
This entire sequence would then be repeated by the other player or team, completing one game turn.

Publication history
In 1976, a team of developers started to create CNA, with Richard Berg responsible for the gigantic map. After six months, all of the other developers had left the project, and Berg was asked to complete the game on his own, which he took two years to complete. Redmond A. Simonsen provided cartography and graphic design. The game was so massive that playtesting was not completed before the game was published by SPI in 1979, retailing for $44.

Following the demise of SPI, Decision Games acquired the rights to CNA, and started the process of streamlining and simplifying the rules, with an advertised publication date of 2022 for the retitled "North African Campaign".

In popular culture
The Campaign for North Africa was featured in an eleventh season episode of The Big Bang Theory called "The Neonatal Nomenclature". Despite Sheldon's enthusiasm towards the intricate details of the game, his friends show little interest.

Reception
In his 1980 book The Best of Board Wargaming, Nicholas Palmer noted that despite the game's obvious complexity, "the rules are clear and entertainingly written, there are copious notes, and the basic system does seem to have been properly playtested." Nevertheless he called the game "a mind-bogglingly slow job; no doubt the first ten years are the hardest." He concluded by giving CNA a very poor "excitement" grade of only 15% but a "realism" grade of 100%.

In Issue 49 of Moves, Thomas G. Pratuch called the game so big that "it defies immediate analysis of the tactical and strategic planning necessary to win the game." However, he called the game's scenarios the most complex designed to date. He also believed that players could use the game rules as a framework for designing new scenarios.

In Issue 24 of Phoenix, Bob Campbell called CNA "certainly the best simulation of the desert war yet", despite its length. He found a mismatch between the "simple but laborious" logistics system and the very complex combat system. He especially found the air game to be overly complex, pointing out that designer Richard Berg admitted this in the Designer's Notes. Campbell concluded that the game was "a success, if only a partial success. It does not contain the ultimate truth about North Africa, but there's enough there to get on with."

In the 1980 book The Complete Book of Wargames, game designer Jon Freeman noted the complete game would take at least 1500 hours to complete, and responded, "Balance? Who cares? To survive is to win." He further commented that this "was not a game, and to consider it as such is a big mistake. It's a history lesson—a pure simulation. On that level, it is quite an achievement; for people looking for a good 'game,' it is totally worthless." He gave the game an Overall Evaluation of "Very Good for historians, Very Poor for anyone else", concluding, "the game is overly complex and overlong—pure overkill."

In a 2012 review, game designer Andrea Angiolino called CNA "the most complicated board game ever released."

In a retrospective review almost 40 years after CNAs publication, Luke Winkie called the arcane complexity of the game "transparently absurd", pointing out the example that each turn, every unit loses 3% of its fuel due to evaporation, except for British units, which lose 7% because historically they used 50-gallon drums instead of jerry cans. But he admitted that due to its complexity, "The Campaign for North Africa will seduce new players for the rest of time."

Other reviews
Fire & Movement #21 "Player's Notes: The Campaign for North Africa", Gary Charbonneau 
Fire & Movement #60 "World War II Anthology: Chapter 1: The Mediterranean Theatre", Vance Von Borries 
Fire & Movement #69 "Shifting Sands and Army Trucks: The Campaign for North Africa", Nick Stasnapolis
Simulacrum #2 "The Campaign for North Africa" John Kula

References

External links
CNA Play Group at ProBoards
 The Campaign for North Africa: The Desert War 1940-43 at BoardGameGeek

Board games introduced in 1978
Richard Berg games
Simulations Publications games
Wargames introduced in 1978
Campaign for North Africa, The